Nancy Lenehan (born April 26, 1953) is an American actress who has appeared in film and television since the 1980s. She is best known for Audrey in Grace Under Fire (1993-1998), Kay Hickey in My Name Is Earl (2005-2008), and Angela in Worst Week (2008-2009).

Early life and education 
Lenehan was born in Long Island, New York. She attended Yankton College in Yankton, South Dakota.

Career 
She co-starred on the short-lived sitcom Worst Week. She also co-starred as Sandy Kelly, the matriarch in the sitcom Married to the Kellys, and had a recurring role on My Name Is Earl as Earl and Randy's mother, Kay Hickey. She also had a recurring role on the sitcom Ellen during its fourth season, playing the title character's realtor, Margaret Reed.

She has appeared in featured, recurring and guest roles in many television shows and television movies, and feature films, including Malcolm in the Middle, Everybody Loves Raymond, How I Met Your Mother, Judging Amy, Gilmore Girls, Caroline in the City (playing office manager Plum in two episodes in Season 4), Dharma & Greg, Buffy the Vampire Slayer, 3rd Rock from the Sun, ER, Boy Meets World, The Nanny, Quantum Leap, Roseanne, Grace Under Fire, V, The Facts of Life, Hill Street Blues, Veep and Alice. 

She provided the speaking and singing voice of Helen Henny from Chuck E. Cheese's Pizza Time Theater restaurants from 1983 to 1991.

Filmography

Film

Television

References

External links 
 

1953 births
20th-century American actresses
21st-century American actresses
Actresses from New York (state)
American film actresses
American television actresses
Living people
People from Long Island
Yankton College alumni